Kagoshima Rebnise  is a Japanese professional basketball team located in Kagoshima, Kagoshima. The team currently competes in the B.League. Some players were not paid in 2016-17.

Roster

Notable players
Yoshihiko Amano
Christian Cunningham
Luke Evans (fr)
Fumiya Ikei
Chukwudiebere Maduabum
Chris Olivier
Chad Posthumus
Kenta Tateyama

Head coaches
Toshihide Sameshima
Michael Olson (2012–13)
Masahiro Ohara
Kazuo Kusumoto
Predrag Krunić

Arenas
Kagoshima Arena
Kagoshima Prefectural Sports Center Gymnasium
Aira City General Sports Park Gymnasium
Ibusuki General Gymnasium
Sun Arena Sendai
Higashikushira Town General Gymnasium
Yusui Town Yoshimatsu Gymnasium

References

 
Basketball teams in Japan
Basketball teams established in 2008
2008 establishments in Japan
Sports teams in Kagoshima Prefecture